This article is an incomplete outline of terrorist incidents in Pakistan in 2022 in chronological order.

January–March
20 January - 2022 Lahore bombing
25 January - 2022 Kech District attack
 2 February - 2022 Panjgur and Naushki raids
 2 March - March 2022 Quetta bombing
 3 March - 2022 Sibi suicide bombing
 4 March - 2022 Peshawar mosque attack
 15 March - 2022 Sibi IED explosion

April–June
 26 April - 2022 University of Karachi bombing
 12 May - 2022 Karachi Saddar bombing
 15 May - 2022 Miranshah suicide bombing
 16 May - 2022 Karachi Bolton Market bombing

July–September
 13 September - 2022 Swat blast

October–December
 16 November - 2022 Lakki Marwat attack
 30 November - November 2022 Quetta bombing
 14 December - December 2022 Miranshah suicide bombing
 18 December - 2022 Bannu CTD centre attack
 23 December - 2022 Islamabad suicide attack
 25 December - Five Pakistan Army personnel were killed in a improvised explosive device (IED) blast during a clearance operation in Kahan, Balochistan.

References

 
Pakistan
2022